José Durañona (March 29, 1923 – February 5, 2021) was an Argentine freestyle swimmer who competed at the 1948 Summer Olympics in the 400 m freestyle and 4×200 m freestyle relay, reaching the final in the latter and coming 6th.

References

1923 births
2021 deaths
Swimmers at the 1948 Summer Olympics
Olympic swimmers of Argentina
Argentine male freestyle swimmers